is one type of bite-sized Japanese rice cracker (arare) which is made by Uegakibeika Co. Ltd. in Hyōgo Prefecture in Japan. It is an assortment of crackers which has many savory flavors, squares of edible kelp (kombu) and dried, thick edible seaweed (nori).

Notes

External links
  Uegakibeika Co. Ltd.

Japanese snack food
Crackers (food)
Beika